Tempest is an original novel by Christopher Bulis  featuring the fictional archaeologist Bernice Summerfield. The New Adventures were a spin-off from the long-running British science fiction television series Doctor Who.

Synopsis
The Drell Imnulate is a powerful object lost somewhere on the Polar Express, a powerful train traversing the hostile world of 'Tempest'. Factions on the train want to the Imnulate and are willing to kill innocent people to get to it. It is up to Bernice to save the day.

External links
The Cloister Library - Tempest

1998 British novels
1998 science fiction novels
Virgin New Adventures
Novels by Christopher Bulis